Mike Seifert is a former player in the National Football League for the Cleveland Browns in 1974 as a defensive end. Seifert was drafted in the thirteenth round of the 1974 NFL Draft by the Browns. He played at the collegiate level at the University of Wisconsin–Madison.

Biography
Seifert was born Michael Patrick Seifert on March 31, 1951 in Port Washington, Wisconsin.
Elementary ..., 
Valders High School 196X - 196X   
Kiel High School 196X - 1970

References

1951 births
Living people
Cleveland Browns players
People from Port Washington, Wisconsin
Players of American football from Wisconsin
Wisconsin Badgers football players
Sportspeople from the Milwaukee metropolitan area